Kozarek may refer to the following places in Poland:

Kozarek Mały
Kozarek Wielki